The Brooklyn Citizen was a newspaper serving Brooklyn in New York City from 1887 to 1947. It became influential under editor Andrew McLean (1848-1922), a Scottish immigrant from Renton, West Dunbartonshire. Its offices were located at Fulton and Adams Streets near Borough Hall in Downtown Brooklyn, in a section of buildings later demolished for the construction of Cadman Plaza.

Distribution 
By 1912, ninety percent of the Citizen's distribution went to Brooklyn homes. In 1942/1943, daily circulation totaled 31,000.

Union conflicts 
Staff were involved in a major strike in 1894, alongside staff from The Brooklyn Ties and The Brooklyn Standard Union who were all members of the Brooklyn Typographical Union No. 98; almost all 75 typesetters at the Brooklyn Citizen went on strike. As a result of this strike, circulation of the Citizen fell by one third.

In 1943, employees sought union recognition through the Newspaper Guild of New York, of the American Newspaper Guild. The Citizen refused to recognize the union, and the National Labor Relations Board ruled that an election must be held and recognized by the newspaper in September 1943.

References 

Defunct newspapers published in New York City
1887 establishments in New York (state)
1947 disestablishments in New York (state)
Publications established in 1887
Publications disestablished in 1947
Newspapers published in Brooklyn
Daily newspapers published in New York City